Phytoecia millefolii is a species of beetle in the family Cerambycidae. It was described by Adams in 1817, originally under the genus Saperda. It has a wide distribution between Europe and the Middle East.

Subspecies
 Phytoecia millefolii millefolii Adams, 1817
 Phytoecia millefolii alziari (Sama, 1992)

References

Phytoecia
Beetles described in 1817